This is a list of diplomatic missions in New Zealand.  At present there are 49 embassies/high commissions resident in Wellington, the capital. About ninety other countries accredit their ambassadors from elsewhere.

Diplomatic missions in Wellington

Embassies and High Commissions

Other missions or delegations
 (Delegation of the European Commission) 
 (Economic & Cultural Office)

Gallery

Consular missions

Auckland

 (Consulate-General)
 (Consulate)
 (Consulate-General) 
 (Consulate-General)
 (Consulate-General)
 (Consulate-General)
 (Consulate-General)
 (Consulate-General)
 (Consulate)
 (Economic & Cultural Office)
 (Consulate-General)
 (Consulate-General)
 (Consulate-General)
 (Consulate-General)

Christchurch 
 (Consulate-General)
 (Consular Office)

Non-resident representation
Unless noted, the missions below are resident in Canberra.

 (Singapore)

 (Nassau)
 (Jakarta)

 (Ottawa)

 (Tokyo)
 (Ottawa)

 (Tokyo)

 (Tokyo)
 (Pretoria)

 (Tokyo)
 (Tokyo)

 (Beijing)

 (Kuala Lumpur)

 (Tokyo)
 (Beijing)
 (Reykjavík)

 (Tokyo)

 (Singapore)

 (South Tarawa)
 (Jakarta)

 (Tokyo)

 (Kuala Lumpur)
 (Tokyo)

 (Tokyo)
 (Singapore)
 (Tokyo)

 (Tokyo)

 (Tokyo)

 (New Delhi)

 (Tokyo)

 (Singapore)
 (Tokyo)

 (New Delhi)
 (Beijing)

 (Beijing)

 (Tokyo)
 (Jakarta)

Former Embassies 
 
  (closed in 1989)

See also
Foreign relations of New Zealand
List of diplomatic missions of New Zealand
Visa policy of New Zealand

References

External links
Diplomatic List Wellington

 
Diplomatic
New Zealand